Chan Ming-shu (born September 25, 1971) is a former taijiquan athlete from Taiwan. He is a triple-medalist at the Asian Games and the East Asian Games including a one-time gold medalist in each event. He also won a silver medal at the 1997 World Wushu Championships. From 1993 to 2001, he consecutively won the Taiwan taijiquan national championship eight times.

See also 

 List of Asian Games medalists in wushu

References 

1972 births
Living people
Taiwanese wushu practitioners
Wushu practitioners at the 1990 Asian Games
Wushu practitioners at the 1994 Asian Games
Wushu practitioners at the 1998 Asian Games
Wushu practitioners at the 2002 Asian Games
Medalists at the 1994 Asian Games
Medalists at the 1998 Asian Games
Medalists at the 2002 Asian Games
Asian Games medalists in wushu
Asian Games gold medalists for Chinese Taipei
Asian Games silver medalists for Chinese Taipei